Joseph Dowling (2 February 1922 – 31 May 2014) was an Irish Fianna Fáil politician. An auctioneer before entering politics, Dowling was first elected to Dáil Éireann as a Fianna Fáil Teachta Dála (TD) for the Dublin South-West constituency at the 1965 general election, having previously stood at the 1961 general election. Dowling held his seat at every subsequent election until he lost it at the 1977 general election in the new Dublin Ballyfermot constituency. He was then elected to Seanad Éireann on the Labour Panel. He died in Ballinasloe in May 2014 at the age of 92.

References

1922 births
2014 deaths
Fianna Fáil TDs
Members of the 18th Dáil
Members of the 19th Dáil
Members of the 20th Dáil
Members of the 14th Seanad
Politicians from County Dublin
Fianna Fáil senators